Mario Marina (born 3 August 1989) is a Croatian football midfielder who plays for Slaven Belupo in the 1. HNL.

Club career
On 29 December 2019, Marina signed 1.5 years contract with Azerbaijan Premier League side Sabah.

Honours

Club
Široki Brijeg
 Bosnia and Herzegovina Football Cup (1): 2016–17

Gorica
 Croatian Second Football League (1): 2017–18

References

External links
 

1989 births
Living people
People from Bugojno
Association football midfielders
Croatian footballers
NK Imotski players
HNK Šibenik players
HNK Gorica players
NK Široki Brijeg players
Sabah FC (Azerbaijan) players
NK Slaven Belupo players
First Football League (Croatia) players
Croatian Football League players
Premier League of Bosnia and Herzegovina players
Azerbaijan Premier League players
Croatian expatriate footballers
Expatriate footballers in Bosnia and Herzegovina
Croatian expatriate sportspeople in Bosnia and Herzegovina
Expatriate footballers in Azerbaijan
Croatian expatriate sportspeople in Azerbaijan